The Hep Stars are a Swedish rock band formed in Stockholm in 1963. During 1965–1966 the band was the most successful of contemporary 1960s Swedish pop groups performing in the English language. Outside the Nordic countries the band is best known as a launching point for the keyboard player and composer Benny Andersson, who went on to enjoy worldwide success with ABBA.

The band was founded by the drummer Christer "Chrille" Pettersson (3 November 1942 – 27 August 2006) and the bass guitarist Lennart "Lelle" Hegland (9 January 1943 – 13 April 2022) with the keyboard player Hans Östlund and the guitarist-singer Jan "Janne" Frisk (29 November 1943). At the height of their popularity, the line-up consisted of Hegland, Pettersson, Frisk, Sven Ove "Svenne" Hedlund on lead vocals (10 March 1945, Solna – 3 December 2022) and Benny Andersson on keyboards.

Beginnings
Originally, the band called themselves Quartet Yep. Their repertoire included various styles of music from Latin dance to rock in order to get as many gigs as possible in varying venues. Influenced mainly by Frisk, their music started to veer towards rock'n'roll and pop. The band decided a more intriguing name was in order and on Frisk's suggestion Hep Stars was chosen. The idea came from a line in the Bill Haley song "Razzle Dazzle" – "It's the hipster's dance" – with a slight alteration in written form. They started to get support gigs also closing after the headline act. A typical gig had them playing for around four hours with one set of rock.

Hegland called Hedlund to fill the singer's slot for Frisk who had temporarily joined a tour backing band for some extra money for a new guitar amp. The band quickly noticed Hedlund's abilities as both a singer and a frontman. On Frisk's return, they shared lead vocals for a period of time with Frisk singing the more straightforward rockers and Hedlund handling the ballads.

By the summer of 1964, they were performing to audiences of 2000. The rock scene took note of them after one evening in Nalen, the most important rock club in Sweden during the 1960s. The main act failed to appear and the Hep Stars, the support act, filled in to great acclaim, especially among rockers (or raggare as they were known in Sweden). Their reputation started to spread through word-of-mouth.

At this point, Hegland managed to persuade the music businessman and Olga-record label owner Åke Gerhard to be their manager.

After the group's first single ("Kana Kapila", 1964) the original keyboard player, Hans Östlund, was asked to leave because of relations growing sour, especially with Hedlund and founder member Pettersson, who left the band fed up with squabbles. He was asked to rejoin and the band continued as a four piece for a short time in autumn 1964.

Hedlund owned a van and occasionally drove other bands to gigs. One of these bands was Elverkets Spelmanslag so Hedlund saw Benny Andersson performing, making an impression with his quick runs and fill-ins. On Hedlund's suggestion, Andersson was called for an audition. In turn, Andersson had earlier read a tabloid article about the camping car Hep Stars used when touring and which could hold both the band and the equipment. This assured him that Hep Stars had it going along with their assuring comments on the current scene.

The band had become what is considered to be the classic line-up: Sven Hedlund (vocals), Jan Frisk (guitar/vocals), Benny Andersson (keyboards), Lennart Hegland (bass guitar) and Christer Pettersson (drums). The fans were soon to absorb their nicknames Svenne, Janne, Benny, Lelle and Chrille.

Breakthrough
Hep Stars recorded their next three singles in one six-hour session without overdubs on three-track equipment.
They performed in the TV program Drop In in March 1965. In April, they had three songs in the radio playlist top 4 at the same time: "Cadillac", "Farmer John" and "A Tribute To Buddy Holly". On the sales chart "Cadillac" and "Farmer" peaked at #1 for one week and four weeks respectively, while "Tribute" peaked at #5. Hedlund became the band's figurehead and the first true pop star in Sweden, the band itself being headline material in tabloids and various youth-oriented magazines.

Other Swedish bands such as Tages and Shanes who largely wrote their own songs made a remark on Hep Stars using cover versions. This motivated Andersson to try to write songs for the band. Also, it was a hard job to try to find fresh songs for the band's repertoire. The first song he introduced to the band was "No Response" which reached #3 in the charts. The band was at the height of popularity, especially among rock audiences, during 1965–1966 with both cover and original songs. In 1966, they performed 150 gigs in Sweden alone. The popularity grew rapidly and the band was highly successful also in Norway and Finland making several tours in both countries.

Mainstream success, break up
"I Natt Jag Drömde" a Swedish version of "Last Night I Had A Strangest Dream" was a massive hit in Sweden but, being a folk-song, divided the band to a degree. It also caused confusion among rock-oriented fans. The band continued playing up to 200 gigs in 1967. However, problems arose when the backup organisation made a less than adequate job with the tax authorities and in the general running of the business. At the same time, the general economic situation in the country started to stagnate towards the end of the 1960s.
Together, they forced the band to navigate towards a wider audience and the showband scene. The American singer Charlotte Walker joined in 1968.

This move contradicted especially with Frisk, who was eventually asked to leave early in 1969 due to diminishing interest. Björn Ulvaeus from the Hootenanny Singers stepped in. The original member leaving the band led to mixed feelings, and the decision was made to call it a day after fulfilling the tour contracts. The band played its last gig in August 1969 after which Andersson, Ulvaeus, Walker and Hedlund left the band. It went through several line-up changes before finally breaking up in the early 1970s with Hegland the only original member.

Afterwards
Andersson and Ulvaeus continued with Hedlund and Walker making a show-tour with the comedian Finn Alberth. After that, Hedlund and Walker formed the duo Svenne & Lotta, who recorded the Swedish original of the ABBA song "Bang A Boomerang". They established themselves and enjoyed considerable success especially in Denmark and in mid-Europe.

Having established their partnership in Hep Stars, Andersson and Ulvaeus continued both as a songwriting team for Polar Music as well as the duo Björn & Benny, which eventually led to ABBA.

After a break Frisk, Hegland and Pettersson formed Gummibandet and released three albums in the 1970s. In the 1980s, a wave of 1960s nostalgia swept Sweden and the members had a discussion about re-forming the Hep Stars. They made some successful tours with Benneth Fagerlund replacing Andersson on keyboards. In 1990, Hegland stepped down, with Fagerlund following suit a few years later.

For the 40th anniversary collection, Cadillac Madness (40 years 40 hits 1964–2004), they re-recorded some of their hits as well as some new songs. Jan Frisk, Charlotte Walker and Sven Hedlund occasionally play concerts together with guest musicians under the Hep Stars flag.

Notes on songwriting
All songs written by Benny Andersson, except where indicated:
1. "No Response" 
2. "Sunny Girl" 
3. "Consolation" 
4. "Sound of Eve" 
5. "Isn't It Easy To Say (Benny Andersson & Björn Ulvaeus)
6. "Lady Lady 
7. "Wedding (Benny Andersson & Svenne Hedlund)
8. "She Will Love You" (Benny Andersson & Svenne Hedlund)
9. "Like You Used to Do" (Benny Andersson & Svenne Hedlund)
10. "It's Nice To Be Back" 
11. "Sagan om lilla Sofi" (Benny Andersson & Lars Berghagen)
12. "Flower in My Garden" (Benny Andersson & Björn Ulvaeus)
13. "Suddenly Tomorrow is Today" (Benny Andersson & Lars Berghagen)
14. "Songs We Sang" (Benny Andersson & Lars Berghagen)
15. "It's Been a Long Long Time" (Lars Berghagen & Benny Andersson)
16. "Speleman" (Benny Andersson & Björn Ulvaeus & Cornelis Vreeswijk)
17. "Precis som alla andra" (Benny Andersson & Björn Ulvaeus)

The album The Hep Stars (1966) is probably the most ABBA-related of the pre-ABBA period. It includes several songs written by Andersson and "Isn't It Easy To Say", the first joint composition by him and his new friend Ulvaeus, then a member of the acoustic group Hootenanny Singers, who mainly sang in the Swedish language. On the same album there was another song, "No Time", written by Ulvaeus alone. "No Time" was also recorded by the Hootenanny Singers in an acoustic version. Andersson and Ulvaeus also wrote two songs for the album Hep Stars På Svenska – "Speleman" and "Precis Som Alla Andra" – and "Flower in My Garden", which appeared on the album Songs We Sang 68.

Among the hits were "I natt jag drömde" (a Swedish version of "Last Night I Had the Strangest Dream"), Mike Berry's "A Tribute to Buddy Holly" (#4, Sweden), "Malaika" (with lyrics in Swahili), "Wedding", "Consolation", "Cadillac" (#1, Sweden), "Farmer John" (#2, Sweden), "No Response" and "Sunny Girl". The group's last hit in 1969 was a cover of "Speedy Gonzales".

Discography

Studio albums

Live albums 

Compilations

Singles (1964–1969)

The book Cadillac Madness – den otroliga berättelsen om Hep Stars had a bonus CD with four unpublished songs from 1966–1967.

1. 1966: Someday Someone (Andersson-Hedlund) – Band version
2. 1966: Rag Doll (Bob Crewe-Bob Gaudio)
3. 1966: Someday Someone – Spinett version
4. 1967: Massa's Mess (Benny Andersson, Lennart Fernholm, Jan Frisk, Christer Pettersson)

A studio jam with the road manager Fernholm on bass guitar.

Notes

References
Hep Stars, 1964–1969, EMI Svenska AB/Olga 7C1 38-35956/7, double album liner notes
Carl Magnus Palm, ABBA, 
Dan-Eric Landen, Carl Magnus Palm, Cadillac Madness, den otroliga berättelsen om Hep Stars, Premium Publishing, 2004,  (in Swedish).
Jake Nyman, Onnenpäivät Suomen, Englannnin ja USA: n suosituimmat levyt vuosina 1955–1965,  (in Finnish).

External links
 Benny Before ABBA The Hep Stars international official website
 
 
 

Musical groups established in 1963
Musical groups disestablished in 1978
Musical groups reestablished in 1989
Beat groups
Swedish psychedelic rock music groups
1963 establishments in Sweden
1978 disestablishments in Sweden